The III Corps was a unit of the Finnish Army during the Winter War. The III Corps with the II Corps formed the Army of the Isthmus (Kannaksen armeija). For most of the war it defended the Mannerheim Line on the northern side of the River Vuoksi against Soviet attacks.

Order of battle
8th Division (8.D)
10th Division (10.D) (later the 7th Division)

Commanders 
 Lieutenant General Erik Heinrichs (30.11.1939 - 19.02.1940),
 Major General Paavo Talvela (19.02.1940 - 13.03.1940).

References 
 
 

Military units and formations of Finland in the Winter War
Military units and formations of Finland in World War II